Cryptoblabes albocostalis is a species of snout moth in the genus Cryptoblabes. It was described by Thomas Pennington Lucas in 1892 and is known from Australia.

References

Moths described in 1892
Cryptoblabini